Knedlington is a small hamlet located in the East Riding of Yorkshire, England, and forms part of the civil parish of Asselby. The M62 motorway is just over 1 mile to the south-east.
Village landmarks include Knedlington Manor, Knedlington Hall, and woodland. Knedlington Hall was protected as a Grade II* listed building in 1966.

In 1823 Knedlington was in the civil parish of Howden and the Wapentake Liberty of Howdenshire. Recorded was the hall built in the reign of Elizabeth I at the west of the village. Population at the time was 118. Occupations included a farmer and a horse dealer, and the landlord of the Anchor public house. Resident was a gentleman and two yeoman, one of whom was the chief constable and agent to a London insurance company.

References

External links

Villages in the East Riding of Yorkshire